Gesina Geertruida Hermina "Ine" ter Laak-Spijk (2 January 1931 – 29 September 2002) was a Dutch short and middle distance runner. She competed at the 1960 Summer Olympics in the 800 m event, but failed to reach the final.

References

1931 births
2002 deaths
Athletes (track and field) at the 1960 Summer Olympics
Dutch female middle-distance runners
Olympic athletes of the Netherlands
Sportspeople from Enschede